= Forcarey Sur mine =

Tantalum mine in Galicia, Spain

- Location: Galicia, Spain
- Products: Tantalum

The Forcarey Sur mine is a large mine located in the central part of Spain in Galicia. Forcarey Sur represents one of the largest tantalum reserves in Spain having estimated reserves of 7.35 million tonnes of ore grading 0.016% tantalum.
